Holly Hill may refer to:
persons
Holly Hill (author) (born 1966), Australian author

places
Holly Hill, Florida, a city
Holly Hill (Roswell, Georgia), included in Roswell Historic District (Roswell, Georgia)
Holly Hill (Friendship, Maryland), a historic house
Holly Hill, Columbus, Ohio, a neighborhood
Holly Hill, South Carolina, a town
Holly Hill (Aylett, Virginia), a historic plantation

See also
Holly Hills (disambiguation)